Sofian Benzouien (born 11 August 1986) is a retired footballer. Born in Belgium, he has represented Morocco at international level.

Biography
A Morocco youth international at the 2005 FIFA World Youth Championship, Benzouien had played in youth and reserve teams of Anderlecht, Beringen-Heusden-Zolder and Brussels. In January 2007, he left for Spanish side Racing de Santander B (reserve team of Racing de Santander)

In August 2007, he joined Perugia of Serie C1. After just played 4 matches in 2007–08 season, and nil in 2008–09 season, he canceled his contract with club in mutual consent.

In January 2009, he joined Eupen at Belgian Second Division. In July 2010, he signed for F91 Dudelange in the Luxembourg National Division. He played for Dudelange until the end of the 2018-19 season.

International career
A U20 internationals of Morocco, Benzouien was call-up to Morocco U23 for a friendly match, to prepare for 2008 CAF Men's Pre-Olympic Tournament.

Later career
In the summer of 2019, Benzouien moved to Luxembourger second-division club Swift Hesperange, where he took over as sporting director and was also available to the team for one more season as a stand-by player. The club parted ways with Benzouien in September 2022.

References

External links

1986 births
Living people
People from Sint-Agatha-Berchem
Belgian footballers
Moroccan footballers
Morocco under-20 international footballers
Moroccan expatriate footballers
R.W.D.M. Brussels F.C. players
Rayo Cantabria players
A.C. Perugia Calcio players
Association football midfielders
Expatriate footballers in Italy
Expatriate footballers in Spain
Belgian sportspeople of Moroccan descent
Challenger Pro League players
K.A.S. Eupen players
F91 Dudelange players
Expatriate footballers in Luxembourg
Moroccan expatriate sportspeople in Luxembourg
Belgian expatriate sportspeople in Luxembourg
Moroccan expatriate sportspeople in Italy
Belgian expatriate sportspeople in Italy
Moroccan expatriate sportspeople in Spain
Belgian expatriate sportspeople in Spain
Footballers from Brussels
Belgian expatriate footballers